Harbour View High School is a high school located in Saint John, New Brunswick, Canada. There are many students attending grades 9-12 there. The school has 68 staff members. The school's Principal is Michael Butler and the two Vice Principals are Christine Dumont and Nicholas McCaustlin, HVHS was formed in 1997 with 900 students, when the former Saint John Vocational School (200 students) was transformed into HVHS to accommodate School District 8's new geographic zoning policy for its 5 high schools. The school hosts several international students.

In 2001, the school population was over 1300. HVHS, despite its location in Saint John's North End, was meant to serve the high school students for Saint John, New Brunswick's Westside, the Grand Bay–Westfield area, and the Fundy Shores area. The school, although no longer formally a vocational school, still carries many trade-related options. A full range of academic courses exists alongside many vocational-type courses from Metals Processing, Business, and Child Studies. Harbour View also has a selection of Fine Arts courses which, alongside visual arts and music, includes Fine Arts 110, History of Rock and Roll, Instrumental Music, and Graphic Art & Design. It also offers a selection of Advanced Placement (AP) courses including AP Chemistry, AP Biology, AP Physics, AP Calculus, AP English Literature, AP English Language, AP French, AP European History, AP Psychology, AP Seminar, and AP Research.  The school runs on a five-period schedule, with a 50-minute lunch break in between the third and fourth periods. Once a week, the school practices Study Hall, which extends the duration of homeroom. Homerooms consist of students from all four grades, with students staying in the same homeroom from grade 9 until grade 12.

The mural on the door panels leading into the auditorium was painted by Boschka Layton in 1940.

Harbour View's school clothing store, Valhalla, sells school merchandise such as sweatpants, sweatshirts, scarves, shirts, jackets, water bottles, and more. The school's usually monthly newspaper is called Harbour Views.

Notable alumni

 Fred Ross (artist)

References

High schools in Saint John, New Brunswick
Educational institutions established in 1997
1997 establishments in New Brunswick